Asarum rosei is a species of flowering plant endemic to North Carolina in the southeastern United States. It was first formally described in 2017 by Brandon T. Sinn in Phytotaxa. The species is named for Mark Rose, "a respected plant collector, horticulturalist, orchid breeder, and naturalist who discovered and documented the species".

References

rosei
Plants described in 2017
Endemic flora of the United States
Flora of North Carolina